"That Tree" is a song by American rapper Snoop Dogg, featuring vocals from fellow American rapper Kid Cudi. It was released on March 12, 2010 as the second single from the reissue of Snoop Dogg's tenth studio album Malice n Wonderland (2009), titled More Malice (2010). The song was produced by Diplo and Paul Devro, who also participated in the band composition, along with the interpreters.

Music video 
On April 9, 2010, the music video for "That Tree", directed by Erick Peyton and VisualCreatures, was uploaded on Snoop Dogg's YouTube and Vevo account.

Track listing 
Download digital
That Tree (featuring Kid Cudi) — 4:31

Release history

References

2010 singles
2010 songs
Snoop Dogg songs
Kid Cudi songs
Songs written by Snoop Dogg
Songs written by Kid Cudi
Song recordings produced by Diplo
Priority Records singles
Songs about cannabis
Songs written by Diplo